Events from the year 1984 in North Korea.

Incumbents
Premier: Li Jong-ok (until 27 January), Kang Song-san (starting 27 January)
Supreme Leader: Kim Il-sung

Events

Births
 8 January - Kim Jong-un, Supreme Leader of North Korea since 2011, leader of the Workers' Party of Korea (WPK) since 2012 and President of the State Affairs of North Korea since 2016. son of the Eternal General Secretary and the Eternal Chairman of the National Defence Commission Kim Jong-il and grandson of the Eternal President Kim Il-sung. 
 11 April - Kim Song-guk.
 16 October - Kim Myong-gil.
 2 December - Kim Hye-song.

References

 
North Korea
1980s in North Korea
Years of the 20th century in North Korea
North Korea